Mount McKelvey is a rocky, mostly ice-free peak,  high, situated less than  east of Mount Walcott in the eastern portion of the Thiel Mountains of Antarctica. It was surveyed by the United States Geological Survey (USGS) Thiel Mountains party of 1960–61, and was named by the Advisory Committee on Antarctic Names for Vincent E. McKelvey, the ninth director of the USGS from 1971 to 1978. During this period, numerous USGS geologic and topographic expeditions, for which he had administrative responsibility, were carried out in Antarctica.

See also
 Mountains in Antarctica

References

Mountains of Ellsworth Land